Syndelphax is a genus of delphacid planthoppers in the family Delphacidae. There are about 19 described species in Syndelphax.

Species
These 19 species belong to the genus Syndelphax:

 Syndelphax agametor Fennah, 1975
 Syndelphax alexanderi (Metcalf, 1923)
 Syndelphax capellana (Jacobi, 1917)
 Syndelphax capellanus (Jacobi, 1917)
 Syndelphax disonymos (Kirkaldy, 1907)
 Syndelphax disonymus (Kirkaldy, 1907)
 Syndelphax dissipatus (Muir, 1926)
 Syndelphax dolosa (Muir, 1926)
 Syndelphax euonymus (Fennah, 1965)
 Syndelphax euroclydon Fennah, 1975
 Syndelphax fallax (Muir, 1926)
 Syndelphax floridae (Muir & Giffard, 1924)
 Syndelphax fulvidorsum (Metcalf, 1923)
 Syndelphax humilis (Van Duzee, 1907)
 Syndelphax matanitu (Kirkaldy, 1907)
 Syndelphax nigripennis (Crawford, 1914)
 Syndelphax pero Fennah, 1971
 Syndelphax pseudoseminiger (Muir & Giffard, 1924)
 Syndelphax pseudoseminigra (St. Augustine grass planthopper)

References

Further reading

 
 
 

Delphacinae
Articles created by Qbugbot
Auchenorrhyncha genera